The traditional star name Al Thalimain refers to two stars in the Aquila constellation:
 Iota Aquilae
 Lambda Aquilae

The name derives from the Arabic term aθ-θalīmain meaning "The two ostriches".

Aquila (constellation)